The bulbus cordis (the bulb of the heart) is a part of the developing heart that lies ventral to the primitive ventricle after the heart assumes its S-shaped form. The superior end of the bulbus cordis is also called the conotruncus.

Structure 
In the early tubular heart, the bulbus cordis is the major outflow pathway. It receives blood from the primitive ventricle, and passes it to the truncus arteriosus. After heart looping, it is located slightly to the left of the ventricle.

Development 

The early bulbus cordis is formed by the fifth week of development. The truncus arteriosus is derived from it later.

The adjacent walls of the bulbus cordis and ventricle approximate, fuse, and finally disappear, and the bulbus cordis now communicates freely with the right ventricle, while the junction of the bulbus with the truncus arteriosus is brought directly ventral to and applied to the atrial canal.

By the upgrowth of the ventricular septum the bulbus cordis is separated from the left ventricle, but remains an integral part of the right ventricle, of which it forms the infundibulum.

Together, the bulbus cordis and the primitive ventricle give rise to the ventricles of the formed heart.

Other animals 
The bulbus cordis is shared in the development of many animals, including frogs and fish.

Additional images

References

External links
 
 
 
 

Embryology of cardiovascular system